Timarni is a town and a Nagar panchayat in Harda district in the Indian state of Madhya Pradesh.

Demographics

As of the 2011 Census of India, 22,359 of which 11,562 are males while 10,797 are females. It has an average literacy rate of 73%, higher than the national average of 64%: male literacy is 81%, and female literacy is 64%. In Timarni, 14% of the population is under 6 years of age. The female:male sex ratio is 934:100, greater than the state average of 931:1000.

Education
It has only two colleges on Harda Road and Rahatgaon Road. There is a very famous school Saraswati Shishu mandir and Radhasosami High School is one of the largest schools of Timarni.

Origin of name
It is not confirmed but some people say it came from the Timran River. Also some relate it with timber (wood).

Connectivity

Road
National Highway 47 (earlier NH 59A) passes through Timarni. It is a junction point between Indore and Nagpur and  well connected by road and train from the state capital, Bhopal and which is about 148 km away from it.

Rail
Many major trains halt at Timarni.
Many trains stop here and many goods are  transported from here related to agriculture, wood and vegetables.

The depot of timber is one of the largest depots of wood in the state of Madhya Pradesh. It is also known for huge production of wheat and soybeans. Timarni is also known for its market as it plays a role as an important center for the villages surrounding it.

References 

Cities and towns in Harda district